Bishopwearmouth is a former village and parish which now constitutes the west side of Sunderland City Centre, merging with the settlement as it expanded outwards in the 18th and 19th centuries. It is home to the Sunderland Minster church, which has stood at the heart of the settlement since the early Middle Ages.

History
Bishopwearmouth was one of the original three settlements on the banks of the River Wear that merged to form modern Sunderland. The settlement was formed in 930 when Athelstan of England granted the lands to the Bishop of Durham. The settlement on the opposite side of the river, Monkwearmouth, had been founded 250 years earlier.

The land consisted of a number of smaller townships which would eventually include Ryhope, Silksworth, Ford and Tunstall, all now part of the suburbs city. The original church was built in the 10th century and surrounding it was the Green, of which was the centre of life for centuries. The core of the settlement was divided into three main streets of which continue to adhere to their medieval shape today, of which were: High Row, Low Row and the Lonnin (Now Sunderland High Street). The latter street connected Bishopwearmouth to another settlement, Sunderland, which was a small fishing port at the mouth of the river. 

The early medieval village was dominated by the Church Rectory, of which the tenants were described as very wealthy.  The Rectory owned 130 acres of land spanning westwards consisting of what is now Chester Road and Bishopwearmouth Cemetery, as well as a tithe barn and a park consisting of 31 additional acres around the river. 

By the 18th century Sunderland had grown in importance and size, and in 1719 was made into an independent parish with the creation of the Holy Trinity Church. Prior to modern urbanisation, Bishopwearmouth Burn used to follow adjacent to the village and into the River Wear. 

In 1855, the rectory was eventually demolished, but its doorway arch was subsequently reinstalled in the newly built Mowbray Park. 

In the 1990s, local artists subsequently recreated the old rectory door and its signature lion knocker with it.

On 11 February 1998, the Bishopwearmouth Christ Church was declared redundant, and later sold to become a Sikh temple and community centre. In 1998 The church of Bishopwearmouth, St. Michael's, became Sunderland Minster.

Notable people
Major-General Sir Henry Havelock, a military leader during the Indian Mutiny, was born in Bishopwearmouth on 5 April 1795, as was Joseph Swan, famous for the invention of the incandescent light bulb, on 31 October 1828.

Rev William Scott Moncreiff FRSE was vicar of Christ's Church in the 19th century.

The physician and antiquarian Thomas Coke Squance FRSE was from Bishopwearmouth.

References

City of Sunderland suburbs
10th-century establishments in England
930 establishments
Sunderland